The Bermudian Premier Division (officially the Digicel Premier Division for sponsorship reasons) is the highest level of professional football in Bermuda.

Teams in this league (currently ten) compete for the national title and theoretically can claim a spot in the CONCACAF Caribbean Club Shield, although there has not yet been a Bermudian entry. The Bermudian clubs who participated in CONCACAF Champions' Cup (the predecessor to the CONCACAF Champions League), qualified in the North American zone (when zone qualifiers were used), last appearing in 1992.

The bottom two teams at the end of each season are relegated to the First Division.

Current teams

2020–21 Season

 Dandy Town Hornets (Pembroke)
 Devonshire Colts (Devonshire)
 Devonshire Cougars (Devonshire)
 North Village Rams (Pembroke)
 PHC Zebras (Warwick)
 Robin Hood (Pembroke)
 Somerset Trojans (Sandys)
 Somerset Eagles (Sandys)
 Southampton Rangers (Southampton)
 St. George's Colts (St George's)
 X-Roads Warriors (St George's)

Source:

Past winners

1963–64 : Young Men's Social Club
1964–65 : Young Men's Social Club
1965–66 : Young Men's Social Club
1966–67 : Somerset Cricket Club
1967–68 : Somerset Cricket Club
1968–69 : Somerset Cricket Club
1969–70 : Somerset Cricket Club
1970–71 : PHC Zebras
1971–72 : Devonshire Colts
1972–73 : Devonshire Colts
1973–74 : North Village Community Club
1974–75 : Hotels International FC
1975–76 : North Village Community Club
1976–77 : PHC Zebras
1977–78 : North Village Community Club
1978–79 : North Village Community Club
1979–80 : Hotels International FC
1980–81 : Southampton Rangers
1981–82 : Somerset Cricket Club
1982–83 : Somerset Cricket Club
1983–84 : Somerset Cricket Club
1984–85 : PHC Zebras
1985–86 : PHC Zebras
1986–87 : Somerset Cricket Club
1987–88 : Dandy Town
1988–89 : PHC Zebras
1989–90 : PHC Zebras
1990–91 : Boulevard Community Club
1991–92 : PHC Zebras
1992–93 : Somerset Cricket Club
1993–94 : Dandy Town
1994–95 : Boulevard Community Club
1995–96 : Vasco da Gama
1996–97 : Devonshire Colts
1997–98 : Vasco da Gama
1998–99 : Vasco da Gama
1999–00 : PHC Zebras
2000–01 : Dandy Town Hornets
2001–02 : North Village Community Club
2002–03 : North Village Community Club
2003–04 : Dandy Town Hornets
2004–05 : Devonshire Cougars
2005–06 : North Village Community Club
2006–07 : Devonshire Cougars
2007–08 : PHC Zebras
2008–09 : Devonshire Cougars
2009–10 : Dandy Town Hornets
2010–11 : North Village Community Club
2011–12 : Dandy Town Hornets
2012–13 : Devonshire Cougars
2013–14 : Dandy Town Hornets
2014–15 : Somerset Trojans
2015–16 : Dandy Town Hornets
2016–17 : Robin Hood
2017–18 : PHC Zebras
2018–19 : PHC Zebras
2019–20 : North Village Rams
2020-21 : Season abandoned
2021-22  : Dandy Town Hornets

Performance by club

Top scorers

Notes

References

External links
Bermuda Football Association
Bermuda – List of Champions, RSSSF.com

 
Top level football leagues in the Caribbean
1
1963 establishments in Bermuda
Sports leagues established in 1963